Frederic Dahl Evans (June 29, 1866 – May 1, 1953) was a United States Army officer in the late 19th and early 20th centuries. He served in the Spanish–American War, Philippine–American War, and World War I.

Biography
Evans was born on June 29, 1866, in Ottawa, Illinois. His siblings included Lynden Evans. He graduated from the United States Military Academy in 1887 and was commissioned into the 22nd Infantry Regiment.

Between 1887 and 1889, Evans did frontier duty. In addition to the 22nd, Evans served on the 20th, 18th, 17th, and the 4th Infantry Regiment, and until 1892, he commanded Seminole scouts. He served at Fort Bliss from 1893 to 1898. That year, Evans and his regiment went to the Philippines due to the Spanish–American War, and later the Philippine–American War. Among other battles, he participated in the Battle of Manila, and he served as an adjutant on one expedition. Evans returned to the Philippines again between 1903 and 1905. Evans graduated from the United States Army War College in 1906, and he served at Fort Leavenworth as a member of the Infantry Examining Board between 1906 and 1907.

After Evans's promotion to the rank of brigadier general on August 5, 1917, he became the commander of 152nd Infantry Brigade, 76th Division at Fort Devens. He traveled to France due to World War I and commanded 156th Infantry Brigade, 78th Division. In October he was assigned to command 55th Infantry Brigade, 28th Division. Evans reverted to his permanent rank of colonel on November 27, 1918, and he retired from the army in 1924. Congress restored his brigadier general rank in June 1930.

Evans died at Walter Reed Army Medical Center on May 1, 1953. He is buried at Arlington National Cemetery.

Family
In 1893, Evans married Winona Anderson, who died in 1925. In 1927 he married Sarah Page. With his second wife, Evans was the father of a daughter, Eleanor.

References

Bibliography
 
 

1866 births
1953 deaths
Military personnel from Illinois
American military personnel of the Spanish–American War
United States Army generals of World War I
United States Army generals
United States Military Academy alumni
United States Army War College alumni
Burials at Arlington National Cemetery